Virginia Bolten (26 December 1870 – 1960) was an Argentine journalist as well as an anarchist and feminist activist of German descent. A gifted orator, she is considered as a pioneer in the struggle for women's rights in Argentina. She was deported to Uruguay in 1902, where she remained until her death.

Biography 
Virginia Bolten, the daughter of a German emigrant, was born in 1870 in Argentina, either in San Luis or San Juan. She spent her childhood in San Juan, a province of Argentina and then moved out to Rosario when she was 14 years old. After reaching adulthood she worked as a shoemaker and a sugar factory worker. While working as a shoemaker she met Juan Marquez, an organiser of a shoe workers union, whom she later married. Instrumental in her introduction to anarchist circles was her acquaintance with Pietro Gori. After a number of years of activity in the feminist, anarchist, and workers' movements, she was deported to Uruguay under the Residence Law in 1902.

Activism
In 1888 Bolten became one of the publishers of The Working Baker of Rosario, one of the first anarchist newspapers in Argentina. In 1889 she organized the seamstresses' demonstration and consequent strike in Rosario, probably the first strike by female workers in Argentina.

In 1890 Virginia Bolten, Romulo Ovidi and Francisco Berri were the main organizers of the first May Day demonstrations. The other editors of The Working Baker of Rosario had an equally important role in the organization of the demonstrations. On April 30, 1890 (the day before the demonstrations), she was detained and interrogated, by local police forces, for distributing leaflets outside the major factories of the area. During the May Day demonstrations she led a group of thousands of workers who were marching to Plaza Lopez, at the outskirt of Rosario at that time. Throughout the march she carried the red flag, on which was written "First Of May - Universal Fraternity - The workers of Rosario comply with the provisions of the International Workers Committee of Paris-".

After she was deported to Uruguay, she carried on her militancy in Montevideo, capital city of Uruguay.

La Voz de la Mujer
Bolten is probably responsible for the publication of a newspaper called La Voz de la Mujer, which was published nine times in Rosario between 8 January 1896 and 1 January 1897, and was revived, briefly, in 1901. A similar paper with the same name was reportedly published later in Montevideo, which suggests that Bolten may also have founded it and served as its editor after her deportation.

La Nueva Senda
In Uruguay, Bolten continued her activism, publishing a newspaper called La Nueva Senda from 1909 to 1910.

Other publications
She published many articles in anarchist-communist journals and newspapers, the most notable of which were La Protesta and La Protesta Humana.

Legacy

Park
A park in Puerto Madero, a district of Buenos Aires, is named in her honor.

Film
In 2007 the government of the San Luis Province in Argentina decided to fund a film honoring Virginia Bolten. The film focuses mainly on Bolten's life, anarchist feminism and the social conditions, which led to the publication of La Voz de la Mujer. It is titled No god, No master, no husband after one of the newspaper's mottos and Virginia Bolten is played by Julieta Díaz. The film, which will be released on April 29, 2010, in Argentina, was directed by the Spanish director Laura Mañá.

References 

1870 births
1960 deaths
Anarcha-feminists
Argentine anarchists
Argentine people of German descent
Argentine feminists
Argentine expatriates in Uruguay
Uruguayan anarchists